Wilborn Temple First Church of God in Christ Inc. is a Pentecostal church in Albany, New York.

History

Wilborn Temple was formed during the peak of the Black Migration from the South to the North of the country (1930s). At that time, Albany had only two prominent black churches, Israel African Methodist Episcopal and Morning Star Missionary Baptist.

The church was formed in 1927 by Ms. Elsie Black and Mrs. Alice Charles Harmon. Under the leadership of Elder L. W. Parsons, the church moved to 79 Hamilton Street, which is fondly remembered as Old 79. In 1940, after the passing of Elder L. W.Parsons, Elder William M. Wilborn was appointed pastor. In 1957, the church acquired the Congregation Beth Emeth synagogue at 121 Jay Street. Elder Emmett H. Jeffress became pastor of Wilborn Temple in 1974 and the current pastor, Elder Solomon Dees was appointed pastor in 2007.

Building

Wilborn Temple is located on Jay, South Swan and Lancaster streets. When built in 1885, this stone Richardson Romanesque style house of worship was Congregation Beth Emeth, the home of two Jewish congregations that were founded in the mid-19th century.

State architect Isaac Perry collaborated with a congregant, Adolph Fleischmann, on a design that echoed Albany's city hall, then newly built, in its rustication, hipped roof, massing around a corner tower and arched entryway with an inscription in English and Hebrew. Jews who had helped develop the surrounding blocks, later moved to the suburbs like other city residents, and in 1957 a new temple was built on Academy Road with the original stained glass.

The temple building on Jay Street was sold to a Christian church and became Wilborn Temple First Church of God in Christ.

Wilborn Temple is now listed on the Center Square/Hudson-Park Historic District.

Rapp Road Community Historic District
Rapp Road Community Historic District – Beginning in the 1930s, under the leadership of Elder Louis Parsons, “courageous” efforts were made to purchase land in the area in western Albany (presently known as the Pine Bush Preserve) to provide housing for those members new to the Albany South End and uncomfortable with its environment. The principal residents of the area were members of Albany's First Church of God in Christ. In September 2002, the Rapp Road Community was designated a New York State historic district and in January 2003 designated as a National Historic District. This was the first designation of its kind in New York State and possibly the nation.

References

Churches in Albany, New York
Former synagogues in New York (state)